Bria is the capital of Haute-Kotto, one of the 14 prefectures of the Central African Republic. As of the 2003 census the town had a population of 35,204.

Geography 
Bria is located on the Kotto River.

History

Civil war 

On 18 December 2012 Bria was captured by Séléka rebels. On 21 November 2016 an armed conflict broke out between the ethnicities Gula and Peuhl representing different armed groups resulting in death of 92 people, many more injured and 12000 refugees around the UN camp outside the city.

On 18 May 2017 heavy clashes erupted between Anti-balaka and ex-Seleka in Bria resulting in 26 deaths. On 21 June 2017 clashes between rival factions resulting in death of around 100 people. On 4 December 2017 Anti-balaka fighters led by Jean-Francis Diandi attacked international forces in Bria killing one Mauritanian peacekeeper. On 16 March 2018 Jean-Francis Diandi was arrested by peacekeepers. On 6 September 2018 Séléka rebels killed a number of people, most of them women. 

On 25-6 January 2020 MLCJ attacked Bria capturing more than 60% of the city after 24 hours of clashes with FPRC. On 28 January both groups signed ceasefire promising to withdraw fighters from parts of the town. On 22 March 2021 Bria was recaptured by government forces. One FPRC fighter was killed. On 2 April rebels launched attack on Bria which was repelled, two rebels and one soldier were killed.

Since December 15, 2021, Russian mercenaries from the Wagner Group have arrested numerous people – mainly youths – inside the town, leading to reported human rights abuses. On January 4, the Wagner Group gunned down young people in a massacre. At 5:00 P.M. mercenaries entered the local mosque and removed the corpses of their victims from the building.

Climate 
Bria has a tropical savanna climate (Köppen climate classification Aw), with a lengthy though not intense wet season from mid-March to October and a relatively short and mostly rainless dry season from November to mid-March. Although the wet season is longer than the dry season, the dry season is sufficiently dry and the wet season insufficiently wet for tropical monsoon classification.

Infrastructure
 Bria Airport

See also 
 List of cities in the Central African Republic
 Prefectures of the Central African Republic

References 

Sub-prefectures of the Central African Republic
Populated places in Haute-Kotto